The LNWR Teutonic class was a class of 10 passenger three-cylinder compound 2-2-2-0 locomotives designed by F. W. Webb for the London and North Western Railway, and manufactured by them in their Crewe Works between 1889 and 1890.

Design

As the two pairs of driving wheels were not connected, the locomotives were "duplex drive" or "double-singles".

They were a development of Webb's Dreadnought class; they had larger driving and leading wheels, and the additions of cylinder tail rods (which were later removed). There were also further modifications to the Joy valve gear, but the seven locomotives built in 1890 had the inside cylinder worked by slip-eccentric valve gear instead from new.

Of the ten locomotives, nine were named after ships of the White Star Line, the exception was named after a character in a Walter Scott novel, as it was exhibited at the Edinburgh International Exhibition of 1890.

Decline
When George Whale become chief mechanical engineer of the LNWR in 1903, he started a programme of eliminating Webb's over-complicated duplex compound locomotives. Consequently, the class was scrapped between October 1905, and  July 1907, having been replaced by Whale's Experiment class.

References

Teutonic
2-2-2-0 locomotives
Railway locomotives introduced in 1890
Compound locomotives
Standard gauge steam locomotives of Great Britain
Duplex locomotives